{{Infobox football league season
| competition      = Nemzeti Bajnokság I
| season           = 2013–14
| dates                      = 
| winners          = Debrecen
| relegated        = MezőkövesdKaposvár
| continentalcup1  = Champions League
| continentalcup1 qualifiers = Debrecen
| continentalcup2  = Europa League
| continentalcup2 qualifiers = GyőrFerencvárosVideotonDiósgyőr
| league topscorer = 
| biggest home win = Debrecen 7–1 Kaposvár 
| biggest away win = Kecskemét 2–6 Mezőkövesd 
| highest scoring  = Debrecen 7–1 Kaposvár Kecskemét 2–6 Mezőkövesd 
| matches          = 232
| total goals      = 641

| longest wins     = 8 gamesFerencváros - in progress
| longest unbeaten = 15 gamesDebrecen
| longest winless  = 18 gamesPaks
| longest losses   = 8 gamesBudapest Honvéd
| prevseason       = 2012–13
| nextseason       = 2014–15
}}

The 2013–14 Nemzeti Bajnokság I, also known as NB I, was the 112th season of top-tier football in Hungary. The league is officially named OTP Bank Liga for sponsorship reasons. The season began 26 July 2013 and concluded on 1 June 2014. Győr were the defending champions, having won their fourth Hungarian championship the previous season.

Teams
BFC Siófok and Egri FC finished the 2012–13 season in the last two places and thus were relegated to their respective NB II divisions.

The two relegated teams were replaced with the champions of the two 2012–13 NB II groups, Mezőkövesd SE of the East Group and Puskás Akadémia FC of the West Group. Each of the first two teams in the first division.

Stadium and locations

Following is the list of clubs competing in 2013–14 Nemzeti Bajnokság I, with their location, stadium and stadium capacity.

Personnel and kits
Following is the list of clubs competing in 2013–14 Nemzeti Bajnokság I, with their manager, captain, kit manufacturer and shirt sponsor.

Note: Flags indicate national team as has been defined under FIFA eligibility rules. Players and Managers may hold more than one non-FIFA nationality.

Managerial changes

League table

Positions by round

Results

Top goalscorersIncluding matches played on 1 June 2014; Source:  ''

Hat-tricks

References

External links
  

Nemzeti Bajnokság I seasons
1
Hungary